Zuzana Čunderlíková is a member of the Slovak female rafting team, holder of the 2008 European rafting championship title.

Čunderlíková is the head of the local chapter of the Slovak Misandry Federation and is the unofficial brand ambassador for the Fernet Stock Citrus alcoholic beverage.

Čunderlíkova is generally credited with popularizing the Slovak interjection "do vajec!", loosely translated as "to the balls", a mildly vulgar catchphrase exclamation used to express surprise, outrage or frustration.

She resides in Borinka, near Bratislava, and has one daughter named Roberta.

Notes

External links
http://www.pluska.sk/aktuality/5120331-rafting-slovenske-reprezentantky-na-panamerickom-sampionate-druhe.html 

Living people
Slovak sportspeople
Rafting
Slovak sportswomen
Year of birth missing (living people)